Rose Pifer was a World Series of Poker champion in the 1985 $500 Ladies - Limit 7 Card Stud event.

As of 2008, her total WSOP tournament winnings exceeded $18,500.

World Series of Poker bracelets

References

American poker players
Female poker players
World Series of Poker bracelet winners
Living people
Year of birth missing (living people)